Alexis Alejandro Salazar Villarroel (born 3 June 1983) is a Chilean former footballer. 

His last club was Cobresal.

Honours

Club
Cobresal
 Torneo Clausura: 2015

External links
 
 

1983 births
Living people
People from Lota, Chile
Chilean footballers
Primera B de Chile players
C.D. Arturo Fernández Vial footballers
Deportes Concepción (Chile) footballers
Lota Schwager footballers
Cobresal footballers
Deportes Linares footballers
Association football defenders